Jeanne DuVall (born December 7, 1959) is an American former professional tennis player.

Biography
A right-handed player from Dallas, DuVall was a Texas 18 and under state champion. She played college tennis for the UCLA Bruins and in 1978 won the AIAW singles championship (over Kathy Jordan), which earned her a Honda Award.

DuVall had her breakthrough performance on the WTA at Hilton Head in 1978 when she upset Wendy Turnbull en route to the quarterfinals. At the 1979 US Open she beat Bettina Bunge, Nancy Yeargin and Julie Harrington to make the fourth round, where she lost in three sets to Evonne Goolagong. She won a Fort Myers Avon Futures tournament in 1980 and was a two-time quarterfinalist at the U.S. Clay Court Championships.

References

External links
 
 

1959 births
Living people
American female tennis players
UCLA Bruins women's tennis players
Tennis players from Dallas